Perla Liberatori (born November 10, 1981) is an Italian voice actress.

Biography
Liberatori contributes to voicing characters in anime, cartoons, movies, and more content. For example, she is well known for providing the voice of both Stella and Chatta in the popular fantasy animated series Winx Club. She also voices Celia Hills in the Italian-language version of Inazuma Eleven anime series as well as voicing Sherri and Terri in The Simpsons since the death of Laura Latini in 2012.

Liberatori is also well known for dubbing over many actresses such as Hilary Duff and Christina Ricci.

Personal life
Liberatori has been married to voice actor Gianluca Crisafi since 2010. They have one son, Valerio Crisafi.

Voice work

Anime and animation

 Stella, Chatta, and Zing in Winx Club
 Stella in Winx Club: The Secret of the Lost Kingdom
 Stella in Winx Club 3D: Magical Adventure
 Chatta in PopPixie
 Bubbles in The Powerpuff Girls
 Bubbles in The Powerpuff Girls Movie
 Bubbles in Powerpuff Girls Z
 Sarah in Ed, Edd n Eddy and Ed, Edd n Eddy's Big Picture Show
 Mai in Avatar: The Last Airbender
 She in She and Her Cat
 Melody (speaking voice) in The Little Mermaid II: Return to the Sea
 Andrina in The Little Mermaid: Ariel's Beginning
 Senior Witch in Kiki's Delivery Service
 Misha in Transformers: Energon
 Lizzie in Codename: Kids Next Door
 Sophie Casterwill in Huntik: Secrets & Seekers
 Jinx (1st voice) in Teen Titans
 Yumi Yoshimura in Hi Hi Puffy AmiYumi
 Iridessa in Tinker Bell
 Iridessa in Tinker Bell and the Lost Treasure
 Iridessa in Tinker Bell and the Great Fairy Rescue
 Judy Shepherd in Jumanji
Celia Hills in Inazuma Eleven
 Jean Crandall in Teamo Supremo
 Little Wendy in Between the Lions
 Young Nala in The Lion King
 Edmond in Rock-A-Doodle
 Scout the Green Dog in LeapFrog
 Tickety Tock in Blue's Clues
 Ginger in TeachTown
 Kai-Lan in Ni Hao, Kai-Lan
 Tiff Crust in My Life as a Teenage Robot
 Shayla in Tomodachi Life: The TV Series
 Lotta in Harvey Street Kids
 Cozybory in Noonbory and the Super 7
 Jessica Phillips in Sarah Lee Jones
 Princess Lolly in Candy Land: The Great Lollipop Adventure
 Andy Arlington in Maya & Miguel
 Billy Bevel in Rolie Polie Olie
 Sam Sparks in Cloudy with a Chance of Meatballs
 Milly Thompson in Trigun
 Hikaru Amano in Martian Successor Nadesico
 Ferro in Gunslinger Girl
 Karin Hanazono in Kamichama Karin
 Naru Narusegawa in Love Hina
 Maho Minami in BECK: Mongolian Chop Squad
 Rika Sena in Kare Kano
 Chiaki Nakahara in Dai-Guard
 Nanami Tenchi in UFO Baby
 Tomoko Nomura in Great Teacher Onizuka
 Kaname Chidori in Full Metal Panic! and Full Metal Panic? Fumoffu
 Rie Petoriyacowa in Agent Aika
 Courtney Martin in Glenn Martin, DDS
 Natsue Horikawa in Boys Be...
 Yuki Nagato in The Melancholy of Haruhi Suzumiya
 Flora in Babar: The Movie
 Flora in Babar
 Baby Bug in Thumbelina
 Amu Hinamori in Shugo Chara!
 Hiroko Asahina in RahXephon
 Akemi in Saikano
 Rika Nonaka in Digimon Tamers
 Nagi Kirima in Boogiepop Phantom
 Saz Higgins in Brain Powerd
 Nagisa Misumi/Cure Black in Futari wa Pretty Cure
 Nagisa Misumi/Cure Black in Futari wa Pretty Cure Max Heart
 Nagisa Misumi/Cure Black in Futari wa Pretty Cure Max Heart the Movie
 Hyatt in Excel Saga
 Red Puckett in Hoodwinked!
 Mindy in The SpongeBob SquarePants Movie
 Morgan le Fay in Ah! My Goddess: The Movie
 Louise Belcher in Bob's Burgers
 Jo in Spike Team 
 Sara in Teen Days
 Lain in Serial Experiments Lain
 Olivia in Oggy and the Cockroaches
 Bobby Sue in ChalkZone
 Rudy Tabootie in Oh Yeah! Cartoons

Live action shows and movies
 Brooke Davis in One Tree Hill
 Lizzie McGuire in Lizzie McGuire and The Lizzie McGuire Movie
 Sabrina Spellman in Sabrina the Teenage Witch
 Olivia Kendall (2nd voice) in The Cosby Show
 Griet in Girl with a Pearl Earring
 Natasha 'Nat' Wilson in Octane
 Lane Daniels in Beauty & the Briefcase
 Samantha "Sam" Montgomery in A Cinderella Story
 Charisse Dolittle in Dr. Dolittle
 Holly Hamilton in The Perfect Man
 Annie 'Nanny' Braddock in The Nanny Diaries
 Mary Boleyn in The Other Boleyn Girl
 Tanzania "Tanzie" Marchetta in Material Girls
 Kat Adams in Ace Lightning
 Sally in Mike's Super Short Show
 Wendy Greenhut in College Road Trip
 Purslane Will in A Love Song for Bobby Long
 Molly Pruitt in Home Alone 3
 Lindsay Gardner in The O.C.
 Grace Bailey in Tart
 Mary "Mouse" Bedford in Lost and Delirious
 Wednesday Addams in The Addams Family and Addams Family Values
 Lisa Atwood in The Saddle Club
 Emily Parker in Microsoap
 Paris Geller (2nd voice) and Janet Billing in Gilmore Girls
 Sandra Volkom in Ghosts of Girlfriends Past
 Jackie Cook in Veronica Mars
 Charlie Chiemingo in ER
 Angela Crabtree in The Troop
 Jessica Hamby in True Blood
 Felicity King in Road to Avonlea
 Jane Margolis in Breaking Bad
 Kelly Driscoll in Piranha 3D
 Yara Greyjoy in Game of Thrones

See also
 List of non-English-language Ed, Edd n Eddy voice actors

References

External links
 

Living people
Actresses from Rome
Italian voice actresses
1981 births